Awem Games is a casual games developer based in Paphos, Cyprus. Beginning in 2002, the company produced shareware PC games. From 2011 onward, they began developing free-to-play mobile games.

Games

Shoot 'em ups 

 Alien Stars (2005) is a shoot 'em up game.
 Star Defender is a series of four side-scrolling arcade-style shoot 'em ups.

Puzzle games

Cradle series 

 Cradle Of Rome (2007) is a match-3 puzzle game with city building mechanics.
 Cradle Of Persia (2007) is a similar puzzle game set in Ancient Persia.
 Cradle Of Rome 2 (2010) is a match-3 puzzle game sequel to Cradle Of Rome.
 Cradle Of Egypt (2011) continued the Cradle series.
 Cradle of Empires (2014) is an adventure game.

Hidden object games 

 Romance Of Rome (2009) is set in the Roman Empire with a romantic storyline.
 Golden Trails: The New Western Rush (2010) has a wild west theme.
 Golden Trails 2: The Lost Legacy (2011)  the sequel to Golden Trails: The New Western Rush has a pirate theme.
 Letters from Nowhere (2010)
 Letters from Nowhere 2 (2011), the sequel to Letters from Nowhere.
 Letters From Nowhere: A Hidden Object Mystery (2014) was the first of Awem's hidden object games to be released free-to-play to mobile platforms.

Simulation games 

 The Island: Castaway (2010) is an adventure/simulation casual game.
 The Island: Castaway 2 (2011) is a sequel to The Island: Castaway.

References

External links
 
 Official Awem Games Page on Facebook
 Official Awem Games Channel on Youtube

Macintosh software companies
Video game development companies
Casual games
Browser-based game websites
Privately held companies
Video game companies established in 2002